Palmer Township is one of the twenty-two townships of Washington County, Ohio, United States.  The 2000 census found 625 people in the township.

Geography
Located in the western part of the county, it borders the following townships:
Watertown Township - northeast
Barlow Township - southeast
Fairfield Township - south
Wesley Township - west
Windsor Township, Morgan County - northwest

No municipalities are located in Palmer Township.

Name and history
Statewide, the only other Palmer Township is located in Putnam County.

Within Palmer Township is located the Shinn Covered Bridge, which is listed on the National Register of Historic Places.

Government
The township is governed by a three-member board of trustees, who are elected in November of odd-numbered years to a four-year term beginning on the following January 1. Two are elected in the year after the presidential election and one is elected in the year before it. There is also an elected township fiscal officer, who serves a four-year term beginning on April 1 of the year after the election, which is held in November of the year before the presidential election. Vacancies in the fiscal officership or on the board of trustees are filled by the remaining trustees.

References

External links
County website

Townships in Washington County, Ohio
Townships in Ohio